Arthur Brown Jr. (1874–1957) was an American architect, based in San Francisco and designer of many of its landmarks. He is known for his work with John Bakewell Jr. as Bakewell and Brown, along with later works after the partnership dissolved in 1927.

Career
Brown was a member of Beta Theta Pi fraternity and graduated from the University of California, Berkeley in 1896, where he and his future partner, John Bakewell Jr. (1872–1963), also a member of Beta Theta Pi, were both protégés of famed Bay Area architect Bernard Maybeck. Brown went to Paris and graduated from the École des Beaux-Arts in 1901, attending the atelier of Victor Laloux, before returning to San Francisco to establish his practice with Bakewell in 1905.

Their first commissions included the interior of the City of Paris department store and the city hall for Berkeley, California, before entering the competition for the 1915 San Francisco City Hall for which they are best known. Brown also designed the city's War Memorial Opera House and Veterans Building, the former in collaboration with G. Albert Lansburgh. Brown was meticulously trained in the rigorous Beaux-Arts tradition, and in the City Hall project his attention extended to the smallest details of light fixtures, floor patterning and doorknobs. 

In addition to their well-known monumental works, Bakewell and Brown designed several homes in the Arts and Crafts style championed by Maybeck.  Early among them were two redwood framed "double houses" for Stanford University in 1908, and the only fraternity house they designed de novo, the Beta Chi Chapter House of Sigma Nu in 1910 (razed by the University in 1991 despite student and alumni efforts to give it historic designation and restore it).  They later designed additions to Ernest Coxhead's 1893 Beta Theta Pi house they had lived in as undergraduates, now a listed Berkeley landmark.

The firm went on to design a series of familiar San Francisco landmarks, and many buildings at Stanford University, before Brown dissolved the partnership in 1927.  For contractual reasons many buildings at Stanford through the 1930s continued to be credited to both.

Bakewell and Brown also designed the Byzantine-inspired Temple Emmanuel (1926) at Lake St. and Arguello Blvd. in San Francisco, and the Pasadena City Hall (1927).

Most of Brown's later San Francisco works employed a stripped-down classicism.  The poured-concrete Art Moderne Coit Tower (1932), that crowns Telegraph Hill is an important Modernist landmark in the Bay Area.  Coit Tower was the site of some of the first public works murals executed under the Public Works Administration, later known as the WPA. "The primitive nature of Coit Tower would lend itself better to that sort of thing than other public buildings," was Arthur Brown's first reaction to the project. Diego Rivera included Brown among the designers and craftsmen in his fresco mural of The Making of a Fresco Showing the Building of a City (1931).

In Washington, D. C. Brown designed the Interstate Commerce Commission Building, its near-twin the Department of Labor Building, and the Andrew W. Mellon Auditorium.  All three form part of the Federal Triangle, the largest construction project undertaken by the US Federal government prior to The Pentagon. Preliminary designs were begun in 1927, with construction in the Depression years between 1932 and 1934. The new buildings were to be designed to reflect the "dignity and power of the nation."

Brown's last works were primarily at UC Berkeley, where Brown served as campus planner and chief architect from 1936 to 1950.  His principal buildings there include Sproul Hall, the Bancroft Library, and the Cyclotron Building, commissioned by Ernest Lawrence and J. Robert Oppenheimer.
 

Brown was elected a Fellow in the American Institute of Architects in 1930.  Among the draftsmen in his office was Clarence W. W. Mayhew. In 1943, Brown was elected into the National Academy of Design as an Associate member, and became a full member in 1953.

Work
In San Francisco unless otherwise noted:
 Folger Estate, Woodside, California, 1905
 Interior of City of Paris Dry Goods Co., 1906–09
 City Hall, Berkeley, California, 1908–09
 "Double Houses" and Beta Chi Chapter House of Sigma Nu, Stanford University, 1908-1910
 Horticulture Building, Panama-Pacific International Exposition, 1915
 San Francisco City Hall, 1915
 Union Station (San Diego, California), 1915
 Burnham Pavilion, Stanford University, 1921
 Toyon Hall, Stanford University, 1923
 San Francisco Art Institute, 1925
 Temple Emanu-El, 1926
Pacific Gas and Electric Company Building, 1926
 Pasadena City Hall, Pasadena, California, 1927
 St. Joseph's Hospital (San Francisco), 1928
 Cowell Memorial Hospital, UC Berkeley, 1930
 Roble Gym, Stanford University, 1931
 War Memorial Opera House, with G. Albert Lansburgh, 1932
 Department of Labor Building, Washington DC, 1934
 Andrew W. Mellon Auditorium, Washington DC, 1935
 50 United Nations Plaza Federal Office Building, 1936
 Memorial Auditorium, Stanford University, 1937
 San Francisco Transbay Terminal, with Timothy L. Pflueger, 1939
 Hoover Tower, Stanford University, 1941
 Cyclotron Building, 1940; Sproul Hall, 1941; Minor Hall, 1941; Donner Laboratory, 1942; Bancroft Library, 1949, UC Berkeley

References

Further reading

External links

Online guide to the Arthur Brown Jr. Papers, The Bancroft Library
Diego Rivera's mural at the SFAI
Coit tower
 Arthur Brown Papers
 Find A Grave

 
19th-century American architects
Architects from San Francisco
Beaux Arts architects
Historicist architects
Mediterranean Revival architects
Spanish Colonial Revival architects
1874 births
1957 deaths
Fellows of the American Institute of Architects
American alumni of the École des Beaux-Arts
People from Oakland, California
UC Berkeley College of Environmental Design alumni
20th-century American architects
Burials at Cypress Lawn Memorial Park
Members of the American Academy of Arts and Letters